Avengers Assemble is an American animated television series based on the fictional Marvel Comics superhero team known as the Avengers. Designed to capitalize on the success of the 2012 film The Avengers, the series premiered on Disney XD on May 26, 2013, as the successor to The Avengers: Earth's Mightiest Heroes.

It previously aired alongside Ultimate Spider-Man and Guardians of the Galaxy as a part of the Marvel Universe block. Joe Casey, Joe Kelly, Duncan Rouleau and Steven T. Seagle, known collectively as Man of Action, developed the series and were executive producers on seasons 1 and 2.

Plot

Premise
Falcon is the newest member of the Avengers. Falcon is the main eyes and ears of the viewer as he fights evil and saves the world with his teammates. The Avengers team consist of Iron Man, Captain America, Thor, Hulk, Black Widow, and Hawkeye.

Season 1
When Red Skull is dying due to his imperfect Super Soldier Serum, he allies with MODOK who upgrades HYDRA's tech from A.I.M. to kidnap Captain America and has him transfer his mind to Captain America's body. After his defeat by a reassembled team of Avengers, Red Skull takes Iron Man's armor for its life support system. Red Skull attacks them at their mansion. Red Skull is once again defeated. The Avengers Mansion is destroyed during the fight. Red Skull plans to take away everything the Avengers hold dear from their lives to their country by trying to have them hated by the people for failing to save the day.

To even the playing field, Red Skull brings together his team of power giants called the Cabal. Red Skull's invitational transmissions are shown to have been received by Attuma, Doctor Doom, and Dracula. Attuma and Dracula accept the invitation while Doctor Doom declined. The Avengers and S.H.I.E.L.D. intercept the transmission, and decide to remain together to battle the Cabal. To stay close to each other after Avengers Mansion blew up, they set up their base in Avengers Tower. The Cabal later on adds Justin Hammer's robot creation Super-Adaptoid and Hyperion, an alien psychopath believing himself to be a superhero, to their team. With the threat of the Cabal, the Avengers fight them at every end as well as other threats that come to Earth.

Season 2
The Avengers encounter Red Skull's master, Thanos, who is on the hunt for the Infinity Stones to power his Infinity Gauntlet after Red Skull stole the Power Stone from him. After the Avengers collect all five infinity stones and manage to defeat Thanos, the gems are drained of their power by Ultron who threatens to exterminate the human race after possessing Arsenal's body. After the Avengers ultimately defeat Ultron, Ant-Man becomes a new member of the team. Around the end of season two, Thanos manages to escape from a galactic prison that was meant to contain him with aid of the Black Order. Thanos then makes one final attempt to defeat the Avengers. With help from the people of Earth, the Avengers are able to defeat Thanos and the Black Order. In the aftermath, Captain America and Iron Man plan to make Earth an "Avengers World" by recruiting other heroes.

There is also a subplot detailing the arrival of the Squadron Supreme, Hyperion's old team which also consists of Nighthawk, Power Princess, Doctor Spectrum, and Speed Demon. While Hyperion served as the "Hammer" for the Squadron Supreme, Nighthawk served as the "Architect" of the team. Thought to have perished when their old planet blew up, they come to Earth in an attempt to conquer it with Hyperion re-joining their team when he hears of their survival. The Squadron Supreme has plans to become the superheroes of Earth and save the world their way. Their plan is put into motion, where they do different plots in their battle with the Avengers. This leads up to the restoration of the Squadron Supreme's sixth member named Nuke. After going into hiding, the Avengers manage to defeat the Squadron Supreme by waiting until the Squadron Supreme's members divide rule of the planet's continents, then they pull a surprise attack and trap each member of the Squadron Supreme one by one. Desperate to win, Nighthawk tries blowing up the planet by having Hyperion absorb Nuke's powers and destroy the planet's core. Nighthawk tries to flee to find another planet, but is defeated by Iron Man. The rest of the Avengers stop Hyperion from blowing up the Earth by slowing him down until his powers wear off. The Squadron Supreme is imprisoned in a special section of the Vault.

Season 3: Ultron Revolution
The Avengers are forced to cancel their expansion plans and Ant-Man leaves the team due to a lack of global threats. After dealing with A.I.M.'s Scientist Supreme, the Avengers are shocked when Ultron returns after his apparent demise and absorbs A.I.M.'s Super-Adaptoid technology and the unknown space metal used to make the Adaptoids. Now Ultron is seeking revenge on the Avengers for foiling his plans with the Infinity Gems' power, while continuing his plot to replace humanity with robots. One plot to eliminate humanity involved the attack on the Inhumans' city of Attilan where he planned to use Black Bolt to power his cannon which ended with Black Widow and Hulk throwing the Terrigen Mist into the cannon resulting in some the humans who are Inhuman descendants to undergo their Terrigenesis including the fiery Inferno and superhero fangirl Kamala Khan who gains shape-shifting powers while taking on the mantle of Ms. Marvel. Black Bolt and his fellow Inhuman Royal Family members Medusa, Karnak, Gorgon, and Lockjaw work to find the recently emerged Inhumans.

One subplot details Baron Helmut Zemo, son of Captain America's old nemesis Baron Heinrich Zemo, finding a working vial of the Super-Soldier Serum and uses it on himself to gain the youth and strength to face the Avengers, defeat, and destroy them in order to avenge his father's death. Then he recruits the Masters of Evil (which consists of Beetle, Goliath, Screaming Mimi, Fixer, and Moonstone) and steals a device from Stark Industries called the Inversion Stabilizer that allows them to masquerade as the Thunderbolts (with Zemo going under the alias Citizen V while each of the Masters of Evil above become MACH-IV, Atlas, Songbird, Techno, and Meteorite respectively) in a plot to undermine the Avengers. But after being saved from death by Hawkeye during the robbery and seeing what it's like be a hero, Songbird convinces the rest of the team to turn on Zemo. Together, the Avengers and Thunderbolts expose Zemo and defeat him.

The Avengers must also contend with Kang the Conqueror when he arrives in the present following his brief fight with Iron Man in his time and discovering that some A.I.M. Agents have been using his technology to upgrade some supervillain gear like they did to Whiplash and Spymaster. When most of the Avengers follows Kang the Conqueror back to his time, the Avengers team up with an elderly Thor, a future Black Widow named Layla, and a group of rebels in order to fight the forces of Kang the Conqueror.

When the President signs the New Powers Act, the Avengers are given Truman Marsh as their government liaison who even replaces the Bruce Banner-regressed Hulk with Red Hulk until the incident where Leader gamma-enhances him enough for Hulk to return.

As the Avengers disassociate themselves with Marsh during the Inhuman Registration Act that involves Registration Disks placed on them, Marsh assembles Red Hulk, Black Panther, Songbird, Ant-Man, Captain Marvel, Ms. Marvel, and Vision as the Mighty Avengers. The superhero fight lasts when the Inhumans Karnak, Gorgon, Inferno, Haechi, Flint, Iso, and Ms. Marvel get mind-controlled through the disks by Marsh (who is revealed to be Ultron in disguise) as he starts the Ultron Revolution. When the Inhumans are freed from the mind-control, Ultron plans to collect radiation to "sanitize" Earth of all human life. With help from Doctor Strange at the time when Ultron takes control of Iron Man's body, the Avengers were able to place Iron Man in a no-tech dimension until they can find a way to drive Ultron out. Setting up in an abandoned S.H.I.E.L.D. facility, the Avengers operate from there as Falcon sets up an inter-dimensional frequency for Tony Stark to speak to them through.

Season 4: Secret Wars
The Avengers' plans to bring Tony Stark back from another dimension experience a major setback when a new version of the Cabal (consisting of Leader, Arnim Zola, Enchantress, Executioner, and Kang the Conqueror) is formed, with Leader, the head of the group, destroying the communication link with Stark and planning to use his Static Expander device on the captive Avengers. Black Panther forms the New Avengers to rescue them, which consists of Ant-Man, Captain Marvel, Ms. Marvel, Vision, and Wasp. Even though Leader is defeated, the Cabal reveal their treachery against the Leader as they activate the fail-safe that activates the Static Expander to scatter the captive Avengers across time and space. Before disappearing, Captain America instructs Black Panther's group to continue in their place until they can be found and returned. The New Avengers work to find a way to bring the Avengers home while combating various threats in their place. After Jane Foster locates the Avengers, she provides the New Avengers special tether bracelets to allow her to send them to rescue the Avengers from each location where a member of the Cabal is overseeing. Vision and Wasp find that Falcon had spent a few years in a dystopian future New York City to help Kang stop a black hole and they prevent Kang from using it to further his conquest, Ant-Man helps Captain America, Hawkeye and Black Widow escape from the Earth of Dimension Z and to free it from Arnim Zola's control, Black Panther finds Hulk has been endlessly hunted by Executioner in the Asgardian wilderness and the two escape him, and Captain Marvel and Ms. Marvel free Thor from the Enchantress' control on her icy asteroid kingdom in deep space. Afterwards, both teams return to Earth to find the Cabal's true leader Loki has taken over Earth with the Casket of Ancient Winters and the use of a swarm of dragons, an army of Frost Trolls and the World Breaker ships that will destroy Earth upon his signal. Both teams of Avengers defeat Loki and imprison him in their base as he vows that his plans aren't over.

As it turns out, Loki had told a powerful being, who comes to be known as the Beyonder, about Earth's existence. To Loki's dismay, Beyonder uses the Bifrost Bridge to take various parts of Earth, places across the universe such as Asgard, and other realities including the one where Tony Stark was stranded, and randomly slap them all together in order to form Battleworld for his "experiment", taking those who live there with them, including the Avengers. With Iron Man back with them, the Avengers must form an unlikely alliance with Loki to rebuild the Bifrost Bridge and get everyone back to Earth. During the final battle against Beyonder, Doctor Strange gives Loki the Orb of Agamotto to begin activating the Bifrost Bridge and Thor throws Mjolnir to Jane Foster to save her from the quicksand transforming her into a female Thor. Through their efforts, they finally undo Beyonder's experiment, but Loki reveals that Doctor Strange giving Loki the Orb of Agamotto was the purpose of his telling the Beyonder about Earth, and with his new power plans to conquer Asgard, Earth, and other locations. With help from Jane Foster's Thor form, the Avengers defeat Loki who is consumed by the All Dark. After Thor regains Mjolnir, Odin has a new weapon created for Jane Foster where her weapon is dubbed Thunderstrike.

Season 5: Black Panther's Quest
Following the defeat of Loki and end of the Secret Wars, The Avengers invite Shuri to a party at their tower. However, after an attack by Atlanteans, Black Panther and Shuri find themselves on a secret quest to stop a new incarnation of the Shadow Council, including Black Panther's teacher N'Jadaka, Attuma's former general Tiger Shark, and shapeshifting Inhuman Princess Zanda. T'Challa tries to keep this mission a secret, telling none of his fellow Avengers except Captain America. With help from his step-brother, White Wolf, he discovers M'Baku and some of Wakanda's civilians to be part of the Shadow Council, while also gaining an unlikely ally in Baron Zemo, whose father led a previous incarnation. N'Jadaka in his Killmonger alias gains allies in Ulysses Klaue and Madame Masque.

The artifact the Shadow Council is after is the Crown, which contains a pocket dimension allowing for one to connect to and analyze the memories of the deceased. Zemo tries to take it for himself but it becomes unstable due to its distance from Wakanda, the only place where it can be stable. Captain America sacrifices himself by using his shield to absorb the blast, after which an arriving Black Widow accuses Black Panther of killing him. With the Avengers and the world now against him, T'Challa frees Klaw from incarceration to learn of Killmonger's plan. He, Shuri and Klaw enter the Hall of Royals, a burial ground for Wakanda's deceased royalty, where T'Challa researches the Shadow Council's plan through the memories of his grandfather T'Chanda, ancestor Yemandi, and Wakanda's founder, Bashenga. In the process, he is attacked by Bashenga's sister, Bask, possessed by the core of the Vibranium asteroid, and also discovers Captain America to have been absorbed into the Crown, pulling both of them out of its pocket dimension.

After learning his ancestor's pasts that are somehow connected to the crown and Killmonger's plan, T'Challa tries to contact the Avengers, who have traveled to Atlantis to deliver Killmonger and Tiger Shark into their custody. As Black Widow answered his message, Black Panther tries to prove his innocence by presenting Captain America alive to her. However, they then learned that Black Widow has been held captive by the Shadow Council and replaced by Princess Zanda. While the Avengers converse with Attuma and his daughter, Lady Elanna, Zanda hides an explosive in Tony's armor. Black Panther and White Wolf attempt to reveal the truth to the Avengers, but are unable to prevent an ensuing conflict that ends in Hawkeye injured, Attuma killed, and Elanna plotting war on the surface world with a betrayed Tiger Shark as her ally. The Avengers, having come to forgive T'Challa, search for information on Black Widow's whereabouts.

Black Widow is found, but when T'Challa returns to Wakanda, the Shadow Council recruits the awoken Bask, who defeats him in a duel to become the new ruler of Wakanda. While Black Panther and White Wolf flee, Bask has Madame Masque invent a beam fired at Atlantis, causing a war between Wakanda and Atlantis. During the battle, Black Panther faces Killmonger and defeats him once and for all, and Shuri convinces Bask to not be obsessive about protecting her people. After this, Bask allows Black Panther to use the Crown to defeat Elanna before Wakanda is sunk beneath the water, while she sacrifices herself to destroy the laser. She passes on to the next life naming Shuri her successor while the Crown is destroyed as a side-effect. Black Panther then defeats Tiger Shark after he takes White Wolf's life. While Wakanda takes Tiger Shark as a prisoner, Black Panther allows Elanna to take Killmonger as Atlantis' prisoner. With Shuri now watching over Wakanda and most of the Shadow Council defeated, Black Panther tracks Madame Masque to a HYDRA base where he reunites with the Avengers. When Madame Masque attacks, she captures Iron Man and Red Skull causing the Avengers and the HYDRA operatives to work together. After healing Hawkeye's hands, Madame Masque sees that Black Panther is right about his claims and ends her own life. With Hawkeye having forgiven Black Panther, he rejoins the Avengers and the Avengers are told by Black Panther that he knows a place that they can dine in.

Episodes

On July 26, 2014, Disney XD renewed it for a second season. It premiered on September 28, 2014. A third season is titled Avengers: Ultron Revolution. It premiered on March 13, 2016.

On January 5, 2017, Disney XD renewed Avengers Assemble for a fourth season titled Avengers: Secret Wars.
 
On July 22, 2017, Disney's official PR feed announced that Avengers Assemble has been renewed for a fifth and final season at San Diego Comic-Con 2017 as Avengers: Black Panther's Quest on Disney XD.

Cast

Main cast
 Laura Bailey – Natasha Romanoff / Black Widow, Gamora (2nd time), Darkstar
 Troy Baker – Clint Barton / Hawkeye, Loki, Doombot, Red Guardian, Nightmare Loki, Whiplash, Kraven the Hunter
 James C. Mathis III – Black Panther, Heimdall (2013–2015), Flint, T'Chaka (young)
 Adrian Pasdar – Tony Stark / Iron Man (season 1–3), Bruto the Strongman
 Bumper Robinson – Sam Wilson / Falcon, Human Cannonball
 Roger Craig Smith – Steve Rogers / Captain America, Torgo, Great Gambonnos, Grim Reaper, J.O.E.Y., Radioactive Man, Nightmare Bucky Barnes / Winter Soldier, Orka
 Fred Tatasciore – Bruce Banner / Hulk, Thunderball, Volstagg, Ringmaster, Crimson Dynamo, Nightmare Ultron, Black Bolt, Brock Rumlow / Crossbones
 Travis Willingham – Thor, Bulldozer, Brok, Trick Shot, Growing Man, Old Thor, Executioner
 Mick Wingert – Tony Stark / Iron Man (season 4–5), Doctor Faustus

Additional voices
 Jonathan Adams – Carl "Crusher" Creel / Absorbing Man (1st Time)
 Charlie Adler – MODOK
 Ike Amadi – M'Baku
 Hayley Atwell – Margaret "Peggy" Carter
 René Auberjonois – Ebony Maw
 Diedrich Bader – Maximus
 Drake Bell – Peter Parker / Spider-Man (2013–15)
 Bob Bergen – Bucky Barnes / Winter Soldier
 Gregg Berger – Carl "Crusher" Creel / Absorbing Man (2nd Time)
 JB Blanc – Mangog
 Brian Bloom – Hyperion
 Steven Blum – Kang the Conqueror
 Dave Boat – Benjamin Grimm / Thing
 Kimberly Brooks – Shuri (1st Time)
 Clancy Brown – Uatu the Watcher, Thaddeus "Thunderbolt" Ross / Red Hulk, Taskmaster
 Jesse Burch – Goliath / Atlas, Bruce Banner (2nd Time)
 Corey Burton – Dracula, Agamotto
 Greg Cipes – Danny Rand / Iron Fist
 Cam Clarke – Piledriver
 Jack Coleman – Doctor Strange (1st Time)
 Stephen Collins – Howard Stark
 Will Collyer – Tony Stark (age 14 & 17)
 Chris Cox – Star-Lord (1st Time)
 Jim Cummings – Ghost
 Elizabeth Daily – Moonstone/Meteorite
 Keith David – T'Chaka
 Robbie Daymond – Bucky Barnes, Peter Parker / Spider-Man (2018)
 Grey DeLisle – Carol Danvers / Captain Marvel, Morgan le Fay
 Antony Del Rio – Dante Pertuz / Inferno
 Trevor Devall – Rocket Raccoon (2nd Time), Ares, Ulysses Klaue (2018–19) Highland Grizzly
 John DiMaggio – Wrecker, Galactus
 Dan Donahue – Attuma (2018–19)
 Robin Atkin Downes – Glorian, Baron Strucker
 Alastair Duncan – Adrian Toomes / Vulture
 Ashley Eckstein – Lady Elanna
 Gideon Emery – Marc Spector / Moon Knight
 Wynn Everett – Madame Masque
 Will Friedle – Peter Quill / Star-Lord (2nd Time), Jeter Kan Too
 Nika Futterman – Gamora (1st Time)
 Ralph Garman – Mojo
 Grant George – Scott Lang / Ant-Man (2013–17)
 Clare Grant – Titania
 Seth Green – Rocket Raccoon (1st Time)
 Tania Gunadi – Iso
 Todd Haberkorn – Haechi
 Ashleigh Crystal Hairston – Bask
 Jennifer Hale – Freya, Friday, Screaming Mimi/Songbird, Gabby Talbott, Layla
 Mark Hamill – Arnim Zola
 Mark C. Hanson – Beetle/MACH-IV, Seeker
 Brandon Hender – Tony Stark (age 8 & 11)
 Danny Jacobs – Baron Heinrich Zemo (2nd Time)
 Jeremy Kent Jackson – X-Ray
 Keston John – Erik Killmonger
 Corey Jones – T'Chanda
 David Kaye – J.A.R.V.I.S., Vision, Space Phantoms, Blood Brother #1, Corvus Glaive Baron Heinrich Zemo (1st Time), Baron Helmut Zemo/Citizen V
 Josh Keaton – Scott Lang / Ant-Man (2017)
 Tom Kenny – Impossible Man, Whirlwind
 Kathreen Khavari – Kamala Khan / Ms. Marvel
 Eric Ladin – Ironclad
 Maurice LaMarche – Victor Van Doom / Doctor Doom
 Phil LaMarr – Doctor Spectrum, Nuke, Dormammu, Baron Mordo, Bashenga
 Matt Lanter – Winter Soldier
 Mela Lee – Princess Zanda
 Stan Lee – Army General
 Erica Lindbeck – Jane Foster
 Chi McBride – Nick Fury
 Daisy Lightfoot – Shuri (2nd Time), Dora Milaje
 Yuri Lowenthal – Egghead
 Erica Luttrell – Aneka of the Dora Milaje
 Vanessa Marshall – Hela, Medusa (4th Time)
 Matthew Mercer – Hercules, Tiger Shark
 Jim Meskimen – Arsenal, Ultron, A.I.M. Scientist Supreme
 Julie Nathanson – Black Widow/Crimson Widow/Yelena Belova
 Nolan North – Gorgon
 Liam O'Brien – Red Skull, Blood Brother #2, Doctor Strange (2nd Time)
 Scott Porter – White Wolf
 Kevin Michael Richardson – Ulik, Groot, Heimdall (2017)
 Anika Noni Rose – Yemandi
 Roger Rose – Tadd McDodd
 Anthony Ruivivar – Nighthawk
 Daryl Sabara – Aaron Reece: Son of Molecule Man
 William Salyers – Truman Marsh
 Charlie Schlatter – Howard Stark (young)
 Dwight Schultz – Attuma (2013–18)
 David Shaughnessy – Ulysses Klaue (2016)
 Stephanie Sheh – Crystal
 Kevin Shinick – Bruce Banner (3rd Time)
 J.K. Simmons – J. Jonah Jameson
 Isaac C. Singleton, Jr. – Thanos
 David Sobolov – Drax the Destroyer
 André Sogliuzzo – Igor Drenkov
 Jason Spisak – Justin Hammer, Speed Demon
 Glenn Steinbaum – Vector
 April Stewart – Lady Zartra, Power Princess
 Tara Strong – Typhoid Mary
 Cree Summer – Darlene Wilson
 Catherine Taber – Medusa (1st Time), Vapor
 James Arnold Taylor – Leader
 Oliver Vaquer – Karnak
 Kari Wahlgren – Wasp, Proxima Midnight
 Hynden Walch – Princess Python, Supergiant
 Rick D. Wasserman – Fixer/Techno
 Steven Weber – Beyonder
 Frank Welker – Odin
 Debra Wilson – Councilor Achebe Dora Milaje
 Fryda Wolff – Enchantress
 Michael-Leon Wooley – Galen-Kor

Crew
 Jeff Allen – Supervising Director
 Brian Michael Bendis – Special Thanks
 Amanda Goodbread – Casting and Recording Manager
 Cort Lane – Co-Executive Producer
 Stan Lee – Co-Executive Producer
 Joe Moeller – Casting Director
 Eric Radomski – Co-Executive Producer
 Eugene Son – Co-Story Editor
 Collette Sunderman – Casting and Voice Director
 Stephen Wacker – Co-Executive Producer
 Dani Wolff – Co-Story Editor

Development
According to Jeph Loeb, the Head of Marvel Television and a producer on the series, Avengers Assemble is intended to closely echo the tone and feel of the 2012 The Avengers film. The series features a combination of 2D and CGI animation.

Broadcast
Avengers Assemble debuted on May 26, 2013, as an hour-long preview. It was followed by the official premiere on July 7, 2013. The first episode was made available free on iTunes on May 21, 2013. The series premiered on Teletoon in Canada on September 6, 2013. It premiered on Disney XD in Australia on October 12, 2014. It premiered on Disney XD in Africa on October 15, 2013. The second season premiered in Africa on March 9, 2015. It premiered on Disney XD in India on December 15, 2013.

References

External links
 
 

2010s American animated television series
2013 American television series debuts
2019 American television series endings
American children's animated action television series
American children's animated adventure television series
American children's animated superhero television series
Animated television series based on Marvel Comics
Avengers (comics) television series
English-language television shows
Disney XD original programming
Man of Action Studios
Marvel Animation
Television shows based on Marvel Comics
Television series by Disney–ABC Domestic Television